Marie-Laurence Jungfleisch (born 7 October 1990 in Paris, France) is a German athlete specialising in the high jump. She finished fourth at the 2017 World Championships and won the bronze medal at the 2018 European Championships.

She has personal bests of 2.00 metres outdoor (2016) and 1.97 metres indoors (2014).

Competition record

References

1990 births
Living people
German female high jumpers
Athletes from Paris
World Athletics Championships athletes for Germany
Athletes (track and field) at the 2016 Summer Olympics
Olympic athletes of Germany
French people of German descent
German people of Martiniquais descent
Athletes (track and field) at the 2020 Summer Olympics
20th-century German women
21st-century German women